Free Will is the second studio album by American poet Gil Scott-Heron, released in August 1972 on Flying Dutchman Records. Recordings sessions for the album took place on March 2 and 3, 1972 at RCA Studios in New York City, and production was handled by producer Bob Thiele. It is the follow-up to Scott-Heron's critically acclaimed studio debut, Pieces of a Man (1971), and it is the second album to feature him working with keyboardist Brian Jackson. Free Will is also Scott-Heron's final studio album for Flying Dutchman. The album reissued on compact disc in 2001 by Bluebird Records with alternative takes of eight tracks from the original album.

Music
Free Will featured a format which divides the LP's two sides, musically. The first side is made up of five recordings done by Scott-Heron and the entire band, which once again featured Brian Jackson playing a major role as he did on the previous album, Pieces of a Man. The title track opens up the album with a meditation on personal responsibility. One of Scott-Heron's best known performances, "The Get out of the Ghetto Blues" is a moving ghetto warning and features bluesy instrumentation by pianist Brian Jackson and guitarist David Spinozza. The second side functions more as a live rap session with Brian Jackson on flute and a couple of percussionists. "Ain't No New Thing" emphasizes Scott-Heron's black pride, which he previously displayed on his debut album, by presenting an argument about the placement of black culture into the American mainstream:

"Wiggy" is a haiku-like appreciation of natural black hair. The themes of police brutality, violence, and self-exploration are still present as they were on Scott-Heron's previous albums. "No Knock", a reference to a police policy whereby knocking is not required before entering a house, and "... And Then He Wrote Meditations", a tribute to John Coltrane, continue these themes.

Track listing

Personnel

Musicians
 Gil Scott-Heron – vocals (all tracks)
 Horace Ott – conductor, arranger
 Brian Jackson – acoustic and electric pianos, vocals, flute, bells (1-5)
 Gerald Jemmott – bass (1-5)
 Pretty Purdie – drums (1-5)
 Eddie Knowles – percussion (6-12)
 Charles Saunders – percussion (6-12)
 David Spinozza – guitar (1-5)
 Hubert Laws – flute, piccolo (1-5)

Production
 Bob Thiele – producer
 Bob Simpson – mixing
 Charles Stewart – cover photo

Notes

References

External links
 Free Will at Discogs

1972 albums
Gil Scott-Heron albums
Flying Dutchman Records albums
RCA Records albums
Albums conducted by Horace Ott
Albums arranged by Horace Ott
Albums produced by Bob Thiele
Spoken word albums by American artists
Jazz-funk albums